Y2J can refer to:

 One of the nicknames of professional wrestler Chris Jericho.
 Y2J (band), the name of a Taiwanese band.